Team Jayco–AlUla is an Australian professional road race cycling team. Launched in January 2011, it competes at UCI WorldTeam level. The team was formed under the management of Andrew Ryan and Shayne Bannan, with Neil Stephens and Matt White as Sporting Directors. The team rides Giant bicycles, and wear Giordana Cycling clothing and Scott eyewear. The team has financial backing from Australian businessman Gerry Ryan  who owns Jayco Australia.

The team has a women's team and supports its riders competing in track cycling. In 2017 they also established a development team, Mitchelton–BikeExchange.

In June 2016, ahead of the 2016 Tour de France the team announced BikeExchange, an Australian cycling retailer, was stepping up as a title sponsor of the team. Team owner, Gerry Ryan, had previously sought to secure further sponsorship after Orica announced they would stop sponsoring the team after the 2017 season. From 2018 until 2020, the team was known as Mitchelton–Scott, with Ryan's Mitchelton Wines as a major sponsor.

History

Formation
The team was launched as 'GreenEDGE Cycling' on 17 January 2011 in Adelaide, South Australia, and signed a full complement of 30 riders. On 6 December 2011, the team was admitted by the UCI to the 2012 and 2013 World Tour seasons.

Orica, a multinational company that provides chemicals and explosives for the mining industry, was GreenEDGE's title sponsor. The team  attracted SCOTT Sports as a bicycle supplier and Santini Maglificio Sportivo as suppliers of apparel.

2012

In January 2012, GreenEDGE made its debut in the Bay Classic Series in Victoria, Australia. Allan Davis won the men's classification racing for GreenEDGE's second team in the race, Mitchelton Wines/Lowe Farms, while Melissa Hoskins won the women's event. The following week Simon Gerrans won the Australian National Road Race Championships in Buninyong, Victoria. He was one of 16 GreenEDGE riders in the race. Luke Durbridge won the time trial title ahead of GreenEDGE team-mate Cameron Meyer.  At the end of January, Gerrans won the Tour Down Under, picking up victory for GreenEDGE in its first World Tour event. The team won their first major European race in the team time trial of Tirreno–Adriatico following a near miss from Gerrans during Paris–Nice. GreenEDGE then won their first monument when, again, Simon Gerrans won Milan–San Remo in a 3 up sprint after following the key move over the top of the final climb.

2013

Going into the 2013 season, Orica–GreenEDGE started at the Bay Classic Series in Victoria, Australia. Luke Durbridge won stage 2 and Mitchell Docker won the third and final stage. Defending Champion in the Women's Event Melissa Hoskins defended her title and picked up her first win in stage 3 of the Women's event.

With the defending champions in the Men's and Women's Time Trial and Road Race in the Australian National Road Race Championships Orica–GreenEDGE had high expectations to meet. Luke Durbridge went out and won the Time Trial on day one. Cameron Meyer followed that up with a solo break in the criterium. With the defending champion Simon Gerrans the favourite in the road race they were set for a clean sweep. Luke Durbridge was part of an early break in the first few kilometers. As the race progressed the other riders of the break dropped off. Luke Durbridge rode the final lap and a half solo to win by over 1 minute. New signing for 2013 Michael Matthews sprinted home to make it a one-two and a clean sweep of the Nationals.

Orica–GreenEDGE had a very successful start to the 2013 Tour de France. After avoiding much of the carnage of the first two stages, Simon Gerrans won the 3rd stage. The next day, in the team time trial, Orica–GreenEDGE took out the stage by beating Omega Pharma–Quick-Step by 0.75 of a second. In the process, Gerrans took possession of the yellow jersey as the new race leader and held it for 2 days, then gave it up to teammate Daryl Impey for an additional two days.

2014

The team started the 2014 with success, tasting overall victory at the inaugural round of the 2014 UCI World Tour, the Tour Down Under – courtesy of Simon Gerrans. New recruit Adam Yates secured his first classification win with the young riders classification at the Tour de San Luis. Simon Clarke took the second overall victory, winning the Herald Sun Tour. In the remainder of the spring season, the team would go on to take a smattering of victories at the Tour of the Basque Country, Tour de Romandie, and Tour of Turkey. The team's most notable wins of the spring again came courtesy of Gerrans, who took victory at Liège–Bastogne–Liège ; whilst Adam Yates continued his good early season form, winning the overall classification of the Tour of Turkey (his first pro GC victory).

Entering the first Grand Tour of the year, the Giro d'Italia, the team targeted the stage win in the Team Time Trial and stage victories with Michael Matthews (who took victory on stage 6 into Montecassino). Pieter Weening took a surprise victory into Sestola on stage 9.

The team again took a smattering of stage wins as the season progressed through the summer, notching victories at the Tour de Suisse, Tour of Slovenia, GP Industria & Artigianato di Larciano and Giro di Toscana. As the season entered the second half, Matthews would take a stage at the Vuelta a España, whilst Daryl Impey would claim the overall win in the Tour of Alberta. Gerrans would go on to take victory in the two Canadian one-day World Tour races: Grand Prix Cycliste de Québec and Grand Prix Cycliste de Montréal. The team's final victory would come from Michael Albasini, at Tre Valli Varesine.

2015

2016

2017

2018

Doping
On 28 April 2016, Simon Yates returned an adverse analytical finding for Terbutaline. Yates had been prescribed the drug to treat asthma, but a therapeutic use exemption (TUE) request had not been filed. The team attributed this to an administrative error. The team took full responsibility for this error, emphasising that Yates had no fault in the occurrence.

Media
The team is known for their online videos created by Dan Jones. Their channel has been successful due to their series "Backstage Pass" which gives viewers an insight into the team and the personalities in it.  As of July 13, 2016, Dan has made over 400 episodes of Backstage Pass.  The channel also had series such as "Bike Riders Can't Cook" and "Sunrise to Sunset" which showed fans a day in the life of a rider or staff member.  The total hits on the channel is currently over 16.5 million.  One of the most successful videos so far was the team's version of Call Me Maybe by singer Carly Rae Jepsen.  It has had over 1 million hits on YouTube and was also used by Eurosport to introduce the coverage of the 16th stage of the 2012 Vuelta a España.

Neal Rogers from Velo News labelled the video ''"Possibly the single best PR move I've seen from a pro cycling team in years!"

In 2013, they made a tribute video of AC/DC's famous song "You Shook Me All Night Long", though they were forced to remove it from their official channel after a complaint from the rights holders.

In 2014 Dan Jones created #SKYvOGE, a series where both  and  took part in a series of challenges off the bike which was also featured on Eurosport's cycling coverage of the 2014 Paris–Nice.

Team roster

Major wins

National, continental & world champions

2012
 Australian Road Race Simon Gerrans
 Australian Time Trial Luke Durbridge
 Canadian Time Trial Svein Tuft
 Eritrean Road Race Daniel Teklehaymanot
 Eritrean Time Trial Daniel Teklehaymanot
 African Time Trial Daniel Teklehaymanot
2013
 Australian Road Race Luke Durbridge
 Australian Time Trial Luke Durbridge
 Australian Criterium, Cameron Meyer
 South African Time Trial Daryl Impey
 Oceania Road Race Cameron Meyer
 Lithuanian Road Race Tomas Vaitkus
 African Time Trial Daniel Teklehaymanot
2014
 Australian Time Trial Michael Hepburn
 Australian Road Race Simon Gerrans
 South African Time Trial Daryl Impey
 Oceania Road Race Luke Durbridge
 Canadian Time Trial Svein Tuft
 Canadian Road Race Svein Tuft
2015
 South African Time Trial Daryl Impey
 Oceania Time Trial Michael Hepburn
2016
 Australian Criterium, Caleb Ewan
 South African Time Trial Daryl Impey
 Hong Kong Time Trial, Cheung King Lok
 Hong Kong Road Race, Cheung King Lok
2017
 Australian Criterium, Caleb Ewan
 South African Time Trial Daryl Impey
 Chinese Time Trial, Cheung King Lok
 Slovenian Road Race Luka Mezgec
 Canadian Time Trial Svein Tuft
 Slovenian Cross Country Mountainbike Luka Mezgec
 Slovenian Cyclo-cross Luka Mezgec
2018
 Australian Criterium, Caleb Ewan
 Australian Road Race Alexander Edmondson
 South African Time Trial Daryl Impey
 South African Road Race Daryl Impey
 World Track (Points race), Cameron Meyer
 Canadian Time Trial Svein Tuft
 European Road Race Matteo Trentin
2019
 Australian Time Trial Luke Durbridge
 South African Time Trial Daryl Impey
 South African Road Race Daryl Impey
 Ethiopian Time Trial Tsgabu Grmay
2020
 Australian Time Trial Luke Durbridge
 Australian Road Race Cameron Meyer
 South African Time Trial Daryl Impey
 Hungarian Time Trial Barnabás Peák
2021
 Australian Criterium, Kaden Groves
 Australian Road Race Cameron Meyer
2022
 American Time Trial, Lawson Craddock
2023
 Australian Criterium, Kelland O'Brien

See also

 Cycling Australia

References

Further reading

External links

 
 
 Corporate Sponsorship Information

2011 establishments in Australia
Bianchi (company)
Cycling teams based in Australia
Cycling teams established in 2011
 
UCI WorldTeams